Scott Macaulay (born November 23, 1990) is a Canadian-born Hungarian ice hockey player. He currently plays for Hungarian team MAC Budapest in the Erste Liga and the Hungarian national team.

He is also the younger brother of the former ice hockey player Blair Macaulay.

References

External links 

Hungarian ice hockey players
Canadian ice hockey players
Hungarian ice hockey defencemen
Canadian ice hockey defencemen
Living people
1990 births
Asplöven HC players
Bakersfield Condors (1998–2015) players
MAC Budapest players
Stavanger Oilers players
Tulsa Oilers (1992–present) players
Canadian expatriate ice hockey players in Hungary
Canadian expatriate ice hockey players in Norway
Canadian expatriate ice hockey players in Sweden
Canadian expatriate ice hockey players in the United States